Wayne Ferreira was the defending champion, but did not participate this year.

Ján Krošlák won the tournament, beating Javier Sánchez in the final, 6–3, 6–4.

Seeds

Draw

Finals

Top half

Bottom half

External links
 ATP main draw

Tel Aviv Open
1995 ATP Tour